Harold Murray Hamilton  (17 March 1918 – 17 May 2009) was an Australian politician.

He was born in Wonthaggi to Anglican minister Karl E. Hamilton and Alice Marion Trewartha. He was educated at Maffra, Orbost and Caulfield Grammar School, before studying at the University of Melbourne, graduating with a Bachelor of Commerce in 1948. From 1936 he worked for the Bank of New South Wales, and in 1940 he enlisted in the Australian Imperial Force. He served in the 2/2nd Pioneer Battalion until 1941, when he was transferred to the headquarters of the 20th Infantry Brigade. From 1944 he served with the 2/3rd Pioneer Battalion in the Middle East and New Guinea, winning promotion to major, being mentioned in dispatches, and being awarded the Efficiency Decoration. After the war he remained in the Citizen Military Forces until 1968, achieving the rank of colonel. In 1953 he established an accountancy business at Dandenong, and later worked for a steel importing firm until 1963, when he entered an accountancy practice in Melbourne. In 1967 he won a by-election for the Victorian Legislative Council seat of Higinbotham, representing the Liberal Party. He held the seat until his resignation in 1982. On 19 January 1968 he married Judyth Margaret Thomas, with whom he had two children. After leaving politics he returned to accountancy. Hamilton died in 2009.

References

1918 births
2009 deaths
Liberal Party of Australia members of the Parliament of Victoria
Members of the Victorian Legislative Council
20th-century Australian politicians
People from Wonthaggi
Australian Army personnel of World War II
Australian colonels